Moldova-Sulița is a commune located in Suceava County, Bukovina, northeastern Romania. It is composed of two villages, namely Benia and Moldova-Sulița.

Administration and local politics

Communal council 

The commune's current local council has the following political composition, according to the results of the 2020 Romanian local elections:

References 

Communes in Suceava County
Localities in Southern Bukovina